GNCC may refer to:
 Grand National Cross Country
 Grand National Curling Club
 Georgian National Communications Commission